Destruction battalions, colloquially istrebitels (истребители, "destroyers", "exterminators") abbreviated:  istrebki (Russian), strybki (Ukrainian), stribai (Lithuanian), were paramilitary units under the control of NKVD in the western Soviet Union, which performed tasks of internal security on the Eastern Front and after it. After the Fall of the Soviet Union the battalions were deemed by the Riigikogu (Parliament of Estonia) to be a criminal organisation.

Background
As Germany attacked the Soviet Union on 22 June 1941, a state of war was declared in the western regions of the country. Vladimir Tributs the Commander-in-Chief of the Baltic Fleet of the Soviet Union issued an order on 24 June 1941 warning of the paralysing actions of enemy paratrooper squads aided by the "capitalist-kulak" portions of the populations, which allegedly had a large number of weapons that had not been turned in. The officers ordered the strengthening of defences of headquarters, army units and communications. Attacking "bandits" were to be shot on the spot.  The struggle against saboteurs was the responsibility of the border guard units subordinate to the NKVD (People's Commissariat of Internal Affairs of the Soviet Union).

Authority
The battalions were created in the territories near the front line during Operation Barbarossa, with the missions of  securing the Red Army rear, assuring the operation of strategically important enterprises and destroying the valuable property that could not be evacuated. The units received authority to summarily execute any suspicious person. Their tasks accounted for the implementation of a scorched earth policy.

Formation
The destruction battalions were formally voluntary while actually a number of troops were forcibly recruited. They were augmented by personnel considered ideologically solid, like members of the Komsomol and kolkhoz managers. There were no other requirements, so the ranks were socially varied, including a significant proportion of felons. The battalions were commanded by head managers of the regional committee level. The Chief-of-Staff of Moscow was Dmitry Kramarchuk.

The training of the fighters took place according to the 110-hour program of Vsevobuch, with the addition of another 30 additional hours under the special program of the Headquarters of the Destruction battalions of the NKVD of the USSR.

Each fighter battalion had to be armed with two light machine guns, rifles, revolvers and, if possible, grenades. 
But due to a lack of weapons, everything that could be used came into service - rifles (Arisaka Type 38, Lebel M1886) and machine guns (Lewis gun) of obsolete models not used in the Red Army, as well as Cossack sabers and other cold weapons.

During July 1941, a total of 1,755 destruction battalions were created, across all territories near the frontline, comprising about 328,000 personnel.

During July–August 1941 in the Belorussian SSR, chiefly in Vitebsk, Homel, Polesia, Mohylew oblasts, 78 such battalions were created, comprising more than 13,000 personnel. Part of these were later transformed into Belarusian partisans.

The battalions were also formed in the newly annexed territories of Karelo-Finland, Estonia, Latvia, Lithuania, East Poland, Galicia, and Bessarabia. Immediately after the beginning of Operation Barbarossa, combat squads were formed. Following the orders of the NKVD, night watch squads were created in areas with large concentrations of the Forest Brothers. As firearms were not provided the nightwatchmen equipped themselves with sticks. On June 25, 1941 the first squads received firearms from the reserves of the former paramilitary organisations and through self-armament.

Actions 

The fight against Anti-Soviet partisans and the implementation of the scorched earth tactics were accompanied by terror against the civilian population, which was treated as supporters or shelterers of Forest Brothers. The destruction battalions burnt down farms and some small boroughs. In turn, the members of the extermination battalions were at risk of retaliation by the anti-Soviet partisans.

Estonia 

Thousands of people including a large proportion of women and children were killed, while dozens of villages, schools and public buildings were burned to the ground. A school boy, Tullio Lindsaa, had all bones in his hands broken then was bayoneted for hoisting the flag of Estonia. Mauricius Parts, son of the Estonian War of Independence veteran Karl Parts, was doused in acid. In August 1941, all residents of the village of Viru-Kabala were killed including a two-year-old child and a six-day-old infant. A partisan war broke out in response to the atrocities of the destruction battalions, with tens of thousands of men forming the Forest Brothers to protect the local population from these battalions. Occasionally, the battalions burned people alive. The destruction battalions murdered 1,850 people in Estonia. Almost all of them were partisans or unarmed civilians.

The Kautla massacre is another example of the destruction battalions' actions, during which twenty civilians were murdered and tens of farms destroyed. Many of those killed had also been tortured. The low toll of human deaths in comparison with the number of burned farms is due to the Erna long-range reconnaissance group breaking the Red Army blockade on the area, allowing many civilians to escape.

Post-war

The destruction battalions were restored after the retreat of German forces in the newly annexed areas to the Soviet Union. In 1945–46 they were renamed to narodnaya zaschita (people's defence), because of the notoriety their old name had gained in 1941.  They were formed from local volunteers, from the most variable layers of the rural communities. They were tasked to guard, secure and support with arms all activities, directives and orders of the Soviet power, which the population could have sabotaged, intentionally avoided or directly resisted.

The primary task of the destruction battalions was the fight against the armed resistance movement. This included terrorising the actual or potential supporters of Forest Brothers among the civilian population, participation in active combat, organisation of ambush and secret guard posts, reconnaissance and search patrols. The passive operations included guard and watch-keeping duties, convoy of detainees and arrested individuals as well as guarding cargo. 
 
The destroyers systematically guarded institutions of power and economic objects in the rural areas. In a post-war situation where the factual state power in a rural municipality lay with the Soviet police, the Militsiya, the destroyers constituted a force which guaranteed the implementation of the Soviet policies. A typical task was to force the farmers to fulfil public forestry, peat extraction and road construction obligations. No measures of coercion policy were implemented in the rural communities, which were not carried out or supervised by armed destroyers. They also fought against crime, both independently and as an additional force to the Militsiya.
 
The destruction battalions were great in size, but they never became the efficient and active armed force which they were expected to become in order to rapidly eradicate the Forest Brothers. Despite the primarily passive role of the destroyers in the fight against the resistance movement, they provided invaluable assistance to the active participants in this fight, state security institutions and internal troops. As local people the destroyers spoke the language, knew the people, landscape and circumstances, knowledge which was inadequate among the NKVD and internal troops. The destruction battalions were also very useful as an auxiliary force. The organisation was eventually dissolved in 1954.

Legal appraisal
In 2002 the Riigikogu (Parliament of Estonia) declared that the destruction battalions in the annexed Baltic states were a collaborators' organisation, which assisted the implementation of the criminal policy of the Soviet regime, and was thus a criminal organisation. At the same time, the destroyers cannot be accused of crimes against humanity in corpore, because of the legal principles of the individual character of guilt and responsibility.

Bibliography 
 Гісторыя Беларусі: У 6 т. Т. 5. Беларусь у 1917–1945. — Мн. : Экаперспектыва, 2006. — 613 с.; іл. . p. 482.
 Мірановіч Яўген. Найноўшая гісторыя Беларусі. — СПб. : Неўскі прасцяг, 2003. — 243 с. ; іл. . pp. 126–30.
 Вялікая Айчынная вайна савецкага народа (у кантэксце Другой сусветнай вайны). — Мн. : Экаперспектыва, 2005. — 279 с. . p. 100.

See also 
Soviet war crimes
NKVD prisoner massacres
Crimes against humanity

Footnotes and references
Footnotes

References

Paramilitary organizations based in the Soviet Union
Non-military counterinsurgency organizations
Occupation of the Baltic states
Collaborators with the Soviet Union
Political repression in the Soviet Union
Military history of Belarus during World War II
Military history of Estonia during World War II
Military history of Latvia during World War II
Military history of Lithuania during World War II
Military history of Ukraine during World War II
Soviet World War II crimes
Military history of the Soviet Union during World War II